The Heroes of Sports Year is an annual award given from 2005 (first as Ukrainian Sport Awards) to the best athletes of year in Ukraine.

List of winners

See also

Ukrainian Footballer of the Year

References

Sports titles of Ukraine
National sportsperson-of-the-year trophies and awards
Awards established in 2005
2005 establishments in Ukraine